Moglicë Hydro Power Plant is a large hydroelectricity plant on the river Devoll situated near the village Moglicë, Albania. The project consists of a large power plant with an installed capacity of 197 MW and an average annual production of 475 GWh. It was built by Devoll Hydropower, an Albanian company owned by Norwegian power company Statkraft. The asphalt-core rock-fill dam is 320 m long, 150 m high and 460 m wide. The dam is anticipated to be the world's highest of its kind upon completion. The reservoir has a surface area of 7.2 km2, and a storage capacity of about 380 million m3. The power plant is part of the Devoll Hydropower Project and construction on it began in June 2013. Main structures of dam were completed in June 2019. Commercial operations were started in June 2020.

References

Hydroelectric power stations in Albania
Dams in Albania
Rock-filled dams